Salvia personata is an annual herb that is native to valleys and foothills in the Andes of Bolivia and northern  Argentina. It grows in disturbed bushy habitat at  elevation.

It flowers from February to June at the end of the rainy season.

Notes

personata
Flora of Bolivia